Hawa Abdi Samatar is a Somali political figure. She is the former First Lady of Somalia, and the wife of erstwhile President of Somalia and Puntland, the late Colonel Abdullahi Yusuf Ahmed. The couple had two sons and two daughters in addition to six grandchildren.

Death
Hawa Abdi Samatar, Former First Lady, the wife of late President Abdullahi Yusuf Ahmed has passed away in United Arab Emirates, her family confirmed.

See also
Abdullahi Yusuf Ahmed

References

Living people
Ethnic Somali people
First Ladies of Somalia
Year of birth missing (living people)